Sarıkaya is a Turkish word meaning "yellow rock" if it names a place and "blond and strong (powerful)" if it is a Turkish given name for males or a surname. It may refer to:

Place
 Sarıkaya, Bayramören
 Sarıkaya, Biga
 Sarıkaya, Çat
 Sarıkaya, Çorum
 Sarıkaya, Yozgat, a district center in Yozgat Province
 Sarıkaya, Adıyaman, a village in the central district of Adıyaman Province
 Sarıkaya, Besni, a village in the Besni district of Adıyaman Province
 Sarıkaya, Erdemli a village in Erdemlki district of Mersin Province
 Sarıkaya, Kıbrısçık a village in Kıbrısçık district of Bolu Province
 Sarıkaya, Nallıhan a village in Nallıhan district of Ankara Province
 Sarıkaya, Sungurlu
 Sarıkaya, Tercan
 Sarıkaya, Yapraklı
 Sarıkaya, Yığılca

Surname
 Hazal Sarıkaya (born 1996), Turkish female swimmer
 Serenay Sarıkaya (born 1992), Miss Turkey Universe 2010 titleholder, professional model and actress

Turkish-language surnames